Wednesday 9:30 (8:30 Central) (later retitled My Adventures in Television) is an American sitcom which aired on ABC in 2002. The series was created by Peter Tolan.

Plot
Idealistic television executive David Weiss joins struggling TV network IBS, only to discover it is a place of backstabbing, constant competition, and a fair bit of bad programming. His colleagues include: Mike McClaren, an exec who will do anything to get ahead in the business, including hiding his own homosexuality; Lindsay Urich, an air-head who gets by on her looks; Joanne Walker, who exists as the token black person at the network; and head of programming Paul Weffler, who has an ability to get things done but is so clueless that often it is by accident. Overseeing them all is the president of the network, Red Lansing, whose orders – no matter how far-fetched – are always right.

The series didn't shy away from surprising storylines. Episode one featured David sleeping with Lori Loughlin which caused a scandal at the network; episode three – "Death Be Not Pre-Empted" – featured the team going after ratings by airing the execution of a serial killer, and episode six revolved around David's attempt to please all sorts of minority groups without displeasing others.

Cast
 Ivan Sergei as David Weiss
 Melinda McGraw as Lindsay Urich
 Ed Begley Jr. as Paul Weffler
 Sherri Shepherd as Joanne Walker
 James Michael McCauley as Mike McClaren
 John Cleese as Red Lansing

Production
The series was a mid-season replacement, premiering on Wednesday, March 27, 2002 at (unsurprisingly) 9:30 p.m. Eastern and Pacific times, 8:30 Central Time – with the title being a play on the common U.S. network practice of promoting both airtimes. Series creator Peter Tolan had earlier written The Larry Sanders Show, Ellen and Murphy Brown. The series was able to attract big-name guest stars, such as Lori Loughlin, John Ritter, Garry Shandling and Lisa Rinna, who all appeared as themselves in the first few episodes. However, low ratings caused ABC to put the series on hiatus after just two episodes, and ultimately cancel it.

Three more episodes appeared after the May sweeps were over; on May 29, 2002, the show returned to its Wednesday 9:30/8:30 time slot, under the new title My Adventures in Television. The remaining produced episode never aired.

Episodes

References

External links
 (archived)

2000s American sitcoms
2002 American television series debuts
2002 American television series endings
American Broadcasting Company original programming
English-language television shows
Television series about television
Television series by ABC Studios